The Garduña is a mythical organized, secret criminal society said to have been founded in Spain in the late Middle Ages.  It was said to have been a prison gang that grew into a more organized entity over time, involved with robbery, kidnapping, arson, and murder-for-hire.  Its statutes were said to have been approved in Toledo in 1420 after being founded around 1417.

Spanish historians León Arsenal and Hipólito Sanchiz have traced all references to the Garduña back to the 19th-century book Misterios de la inquisición española y otras sociedades secretas de España by Víctor de Fereal (maybe a pseudonym for Madame de Suberwick) and Manuel de Cuendías, published in 1850. Arsenal and Sanchiz doubt the  Garduña ever existed.

As a secret society, the Garduña is very attractive for conspiracism, according to the historian Sanchiz. It was supposedly active for over 400 years in Spain and, among other things, it supposedly carried out the dirty work of the Inquisition. In serious Spanish studies about bandolerismo (outlaws) and social disorders (very frequent in Andalusia in the 19th century), there is not a single mention of the Garduña.

Some  have claimed that the Garduña was a precursor to the Neapolitan Camorra, a crime syndicate active to this day in southern Italy, and was transplanted when Spain controlled Naples and much of its criminal element was transported (or deported) there. Author David Leon Chandler, in his book "The Criminal Brotherhoods," suggests that the Camorra were an offshoot of The Garduna.  This, then, he asserts, means that it is the parent Brotherhood society to Sicilian Cosa Nostra, Camorra, 'Ndranghets, Sacra Corona Unita, American Cosa Nostra and even, The Unione Corse.

A Calabrian folk song suggests a much larger legacy.  It tells the story of three Garduña "brothers" or three Spanish knights who fled Spain in the 17th century after washing with blood the honour of their seduced sister. They were shipwrecked on the island of Favignana, near Sicily. Osso, devoted to Saint George, stayed in Sicily and founded the Mafia or Cosa Nostra; Mastrosso, protected by Saint Michael, made his way to Calabria and founded the 'Ndrangheta; and Carcagnosso, a devotee of the Virgin Mary, made his way to Naples and founded the Camorra.

Additionally, the circumstances surrounding the original shipwreck seem to suggest their main occupations as pirates, and alludes to a connection with pirates throughout the Spanish Empire, including the Americas. Similar traditions are told of three Buddhist monks founding the Chinese Triads.

See also
 Germanía, the jargon of Spanish criminals in the 17th century.
 Rinconete and Cortadillo is a short novel by Miguel de Cervantes about a Thieves' Guild operating in Seville.

References

 Arsenal, León & Hipólito Sanchiz (2006). Una historia de las sociedades secretas españolas, Barcelona: Planeta,   
 Behan, Tom (1996). The Camorra, London: Routledge, 
 Gratteri, Nicola  & Antonio Nicaso (2006). Fratelli di sangue, Cosenza: Pellegrini Editore,

External links
The Garduna in Secret Societies of All Ages and Countries, by Charles William Heckethorn, Kessinger Publishing, 1992, .

Secret societies related to organized crime
History of the Camorra in Italy
History of the 'Ndrangheta
History of the Sicilian Mafia
Organised crime groups in Spain